The 2004 Allan Cup was the Canadian senior ice hockey championship for the 2003–04 senior "AAA" season.  The event was hosted by the St-Georges Garaga in Saint-Georges, Quebec.  The 2004 tournament marked the 96th year that the Allan Cup has been awarded.

Teams
Aylmer Blues (Ontario)
Bentley Generals (Pacific)
Laval Chiefs (Quebec)
Ministikwan Islanders (West)
St-Georges Garaga (Host)
Saint John Thundercats (Atlantic)

Results
Round Robin
Aylmer Blues 6 – Laval Chiefs 3
St-Georges Garaga 9 – Saint John Thundercats 3
Saint John Thundercats 2 – Bentley Generals 1
Laval Chiefs 2 – Ministikwan Islanders 1
Ministikwan Islanders 5 – Aylmer Blues 2
St-Georges Garaga 9 – Bentley Generals 3
Quarter-final
Laval Chiefs 5 – Saint John Thundercats 3
Bentley Generals 5 – Aylmer Blues 2
Semi-final
Ministikwan Islanders 7 – Laval Chiefs 1
St-Georges Garaga 7 – Bentley Generals 4
Final
St-Georges Garaga 5 – Ministikwan Islanders 0

External links
2004 Allan Cup website
Allan Cup website

Allan Cup
Saint-Georges, Quebec
Allan